Bror Emil Blume-Jensen (born 22 January 1992) is a Danish professional footballer who plays as a midfielder for Austrian Football Bundesliga club WSG Tirol.

Club career

Lyngby Boldklub
Blume joined Lyngby in 2010 where he played two years on the U19 squad. He signed his first contract with Lyngby in July 2010, but would continue for a while on the U19- and reserve squad. He was promoted to the first team squad in the following summer, and signed a contract extension until 2012. He got his debut for Lyngby in a Danish Cup game, which Lyngby lost after penalty shootout. Blume replaced Bajram Fetai in the 60th minute and missed his penalty in the shootout.

Blume got his Danish Superliga debut against F.C. Copenhagen on 10 September 2011. Blume only got two league games in this season, and three games in the following season. However, he signed a new contract in the summer 2012, that would keep him in the club until the following summer. Blume got his breakthrough in the 2013/14 season. He quickly became a regular part of the squad in this season, and extended his contract two times in 2014 and once again in 2017 after a great season. His coach, David Nielsen, said after the 2016/17 season, that "Bror Blume has gone from being a player I couldn't use to being a player that is an important part of our team."

Blume can play on all offensive positions. In the 2016/17 season, he was used on several positions: Left or right midfielder, central midfielder and attacking midfielder.

Due to the economic situation of Lyngby in 2018, he terminated his contract on 7 February 2018, because he hadn't received his salary.

AGF
Blume signed for AGF on 1 March 2018.

WSG Tirol
After three years in AGF, Blume moved to Austrian club WSG Tirol in the summer 2021.

References

External links
 

Living people
1992 births
Footballers from Copenhagen
Association football midfielders
Danish men's footballers
Danish expatriate men's footballers
Lyngby Boldklub players
Aarhus Gymnastikforening players
BK Skjold players
Hvidovre IF players
WSG Tirol players
Danish Superliga players
Danish 1st Division players
Austrian Football Bundesliga players
Danish expatriate sportspeople in Austria
Expatriate footballers in Austria